The Silver Logie for Most Outstanding Drama Series is an award presented annually at the Australian TV Week Logie Awards. The award is given to recognise an outstanding Australian drama series. The winner and nominees of this award are chosen by television industry juries.

It was first awarded at the 3rd Annual TV Week Logie Awards ceremony, held in 1961 as Best Australian Drama. The award was renamed many times in subsequent ceremonies; Best Australian TV Drama Series (1962), Best Drama (1963, 1966–1967), Best Australian Drama Series (1965, 1970), Best Drama Series (1968), and Best Drama Show (1969). This award category was eliminated in 1977.

At the 33rd Annual TV Week Logie Awards in 1991, an industry voted award for drama returned, originally called Most Outstanding Single Drama or Miniseries. It has also been known as Most Outstanding Series (1992–1993, 1998), Most Outstanding Achievement in Drama Production (1994–1997) and Most Outstanding Drama Series, Miniseries or Telemovie (2007–2012). It has been known as the Most Outstanding Drama Series since 2013.

Homicide held the record for the most wins of the original award, with seven and Number 96 had three. SeaChange, The Secret Life of Us and Love My Way also had three wins each, followed by Phoenix, Underbelly, Redfern Now and Division 4 with two wins.

Winners and nominees

Listed below are the winners of the award for each year for Best Australian Drama.

Listed below are the winners of the award for each year, as well as the other nominees for Most Outstanding Drama Series.

Multiple wins

See also
 Logie Award for Most Popular Comedy Program
 Logie Award for Most Outstanding Comedy Program

References

External links

Awards established in 1961

1961 establishments in Australia